The 2008 Central American Junior and Youth Championships in Athletics were held at the Estadio Nacional Flor Blanca "Magico Gonzalez" in San Salvador, El Salvador, between July 19–20, 2008. Organized by the Central American Isthmus Athletic Confederation (CADICA), it was the 21st edition of the Junior (U-20) and the 16th edition of the Youth (U-18) competition. A total of 77 events were contested, 41 by boys and 36 by girls.

Medal summary
Complete results can be found on the CADICA and on the official website.

Junior

Boys (U-20)

Girls (U-20)

Youth

Boys (U-18)

Girls (U-18)

Medal table
The medal was published.

Team trophies
The placing table for team trophy awarded to the 1st place overall team (boys and girls categories) was published.

Overall

Participation
A total number of 372 athletes were reported to participate in the event.

 (31)
 (97)
 (66)
 (69)
 (38)
 (47)
 Panamá (24)

References

External links
Official Website (in Spanish)

 
Central American Junior
Central American Junior
International athletics competitions hosted by El Salvador
Athl
2008 in youth sport